The white-throated francolin (Campocolinus albogularis) is a species of bird in the family Phasianidae.

It is found in Angola, Benin, Burkina Faso, Cameroon, Democratic Republic of the Congo, Ivory Coast, Gambia, Ghana, Guinea, Mali, Nigeria, Senegal, Togo, and Zambia. These birds are found in tropical and sub-tropical grasslands, savannas, burned lands and shrublands. They feed on seeds and insects.

Formerly classified in the genus Peliperdix, a 2020 study found it, the coqui francolin (C. coqui), and Schlegel's francolin (C. schlegelii) to together comprise a new genus Campocolinus. The International Ornithological Congress has accepted these findings.

References

white-throated francolin
Birds of West Africa
Birds of Southern Africa
white-throated francolin
Taxonomy articles created by Polbot
Taxobox binomials not recognized by IUCN